Cathay United Bank is one of the largest commercial banks in Taiwan, with a capital value of TW$67 billion (approximately US$2.23 billion) and more than 165 branches located throughout Taiwan. It is part of Cathay Financial Holdings.

History
Cathay United Bank was formerly the United World Chinese Commercial Bank (UWCCB; Chinese: 世華聯合商業銀行), which was founded in 1975.

In 2003, UWCCB was merged with the former Cathay Commercial Bank, a wholly owned subsidiary of Cathay Financial Holding Company; UWCCB was the surviving bank but the merged bank was renamed to Cathay United Bank.

In September 2012 Cathay United Bank with the National Bank of Cambodia's approval, acquired a 70% stake in Singapore Banking Corporation (SBC). SBC was founded in 1993 and has 6 branches and 10 exchange offices in Cambodia. A year later in September 2013, Cathay United Bank reached an agreement with the remaining shareholders of SBC to acquire the remaining 30% shares. In January 2014, the name was changed to Cathay United Bank Cambodia (CUBC).

To expand its banking operations in Asia, in December 2014, CUB through its sister company and life insurance arm of Cathay Financial Holding, Cathay Life Insurance, acquired a 22% share (approximately US$179 million) of Philippines' Rizal Commercial Banking Corp (RCBC). RCBC is owned by the Yuchengco Group and is the country's eighth largest lender with a consolidated branch network of over 430 branches. Rizal Commercial Banking Corp is connected with the $81m Bangladesh Bank heist. As a result, the bank's president resigned in May 2016.

In January 2015, Cathay Life Insurance announced a plan to acquire 40% of Indonesia's PT Bank Mayapada for approximately US$272 million. Bank Mayapada, founded in 1989, is a mid-sized commercial bank focused on corporate lending with 175 branches and offices and owned by Indonesian billionaire Dato Sri Tahir.

In May 2017, Cathay United Bank and its sister company Cathay Life agreed to purchase the Bank of Nova Scotia Berhad Malaysia from Scotiabank. The acquisition is subject to regulatory approval by Bank Negara Malaysia.

Overseas Branches/Offices

Currently Cathay United Bank has 9 overseas branches and sub-branches as well 6 marketing and representative offices, including one agency, located in countries such as China, Hong Kong, Singapore, Malaysia, Vietnam and Cambodia. The Hong Kong and Shanghai branches focus mainly on Greater China, while the Singapore branch is very active in the ASEAN local foreign exchange and money markets and is a major investor in Southeast Asian investment grade credits.

Mainland China
A Subsidiary Bank was formally opened in September 2018 
Shanghai Branch
Shanghai Minhang Sub-branch
Shanghai Pilot Free Trade Zone Sub-Branch
Shanghai Jiading Sub-Branch
Qingdao Branch
Shenzhen Branch

Cambodia
PhnomPenh Branch (10 Different branches)
 Head Office (St. Somdach Pan)
 Nehru
 Mao Tse Tung
 Toul Tumpoung II
 Chbar Am Pov
 Heng Ly
 Chaom Chau
 Stat Chas
 Stueng Meanchey
 Saen Sokh
SiemReap Branch
Sihanoukville Branch
Kampong Cham Branch
Krong Bavet Branch
Battambang Branch

Hong Kong
Hong Kong Branch

Indonesia
Jakarta Representative Office

Laos
Vientiane Capital Branch

Malaysia
Labuan Branch
Kuala Lumpur Marketing Office

Myanmar
Yangon Representative Office

Philippines
Manila Branch

Singapore
Singapore Branch

Thailand
Bangkok Representative Office

Vietnam
Chu Lai Branch
Hanoi Representative Office
Ho Chi Minh City Representative Office

Joint Ventures and Subsidiary
Indovina Bank, Vietnam
Cathay United Bank was the first Taiwanese bank to establish a banking presence in Vietnam. In 1990, Cathay United Bank with its local joint venture partner, Vietnam Joint Stock Commercial Bank for Industry and Trade (Vietinbank) established Indovina Bank (IVB). Indovina Bank, headquartered in Ho Chi Minh City, is a commercial bank with 9 branches and 17 transaction offices.

See also
 List of banks in Taiwan
 Economy of Taiwan
 List of companies of Taiwan

References

1975 establishments in Taiwan
Banks established in 1975
Banks of Taiwan
Companies based in Taipei